The Sala Polivalentă is a multi-purpose arena currently under construction in Constanța, Romania.

References
  

Indoor arenas under construction in Romania
Buildings and structures in Constanța
Basketball venues in Romania
Handball venues in Romania
Volleyball venues in Romania
Indoor arenas in Romania
Sports venues in Romania 
Music venues in Romania
Sport in Constanța